John H. Auer (August 3, 1906 in Budapest, Hungary – March 15, 1975 in North Hollywood, Los Angeles) was a Hungarian-born child actor who, on coming to the Americas in 1928, became a movie director and producer, initially in Mexico but, from the early 1930s, in Hollywood.

Career
Auer was a child actor in Vienna from the age of 12.  After he grew up, he had some business experience in Europe, but decided to emigrate to the United States in 1928. He first sought work as a director in Hollywood but luck did not seem to favour him. Next, he tried his hand at directing some Mexican films, which did quite well as they not only brought him critical acclaim but also fared well in box office receipts; some even brought him awards from the Mexican government.

His success in Mexico helped Auer to make a re-entry into Hollywood and direct films. Although he worked mostly for the Republic Pictures who specialized in Westerns and B films, he stuck to crime thrillers and musicals.  Besides directing, he also produced most of his directed films.

The year 1934 saw Auer's Hollywood directorial venture, Frankie and Johnny, filmed at the Mascot Studios. His later years were spent mostly with the Republic Pictures. It was in the late 1940s and early 1950s when some of his B-rated movies such as Angel on the Amazon, Thunderbirds, and Hell's Half Acre were well accepted by the film lovers. He also did a film with RKO Pictures's Gangway for Tomorrow and Universal Studios's Johnny Doughboy.

Filmography

References

External links

1906 births
1975 deaths
American film directors
American film producers
American male screenwriters
Male actors from Budapest
Hungarian emigrants to Mexico
20th-century American businesspeople
20th-century American male writers
20th-century American screenwriters
Hungarian emigrants to the United States